The Very Edge is a 1963 British drama film directed by Cyril Frankel and starring Anne Heywood, Richard Todd, Jack Hedley, Jeremy Brett and Maurice Denham. The screenplay concerns a young woman who is assaulted and stalked by a maniac.

Plot
Happily married couple Tracey (Anne Heywood) and architect Geofrey (Richard Todd) are expecting their first child, when, one fateful day, a maniac, (Jeremy Brett), breaks into their home and assaults Tracey, causing her subsequent miscarriage. Initially unable to cope with life after the attack, Tracey is unresponsive to her husband , and her great trauma does not heal easily. Even after moving home, taking a holiday, and showing his wife every consideration, the strain of waiting for a second attack by the obsessive stalker, and his wife's continuing frigidity, tempts Geoffrey to start an affair with his secretary, who's confessed to falling in love with him whilst supporting him after becoming his secretary, and during his wife's hospitalisation.  In the meantime, Scotland Yard detective, McInnes, (Jack Hedley), has been unable to find the psychopath responsible for the assault, and Tracey's safety is still in question as she is constantly stalked by the criminal.

Cast
 Anne Heywood as Tracey Lawrence
 Richard Todd as Geoffrey Lawrence
 Jack Hedley as McInnes
 Nicole Maurey as Helen
 Jeremy Brett as Mullen
 Barbara Mullen as Doctor Crawford
 Maurice Denham as Shaw
 William Lucas as Inspector Davies
 Gwen Watford as Sister Holden  
 Patrick Magee as Simmonds

Critical reception
The Radio Times noted, "Another British cheapie that hoped to lure audiences into auditoriums with the sort of sensationalist story they devoured in their Sunday papers"; whereas TV Guide called it "An effectively handled psychodrama"; and Movie Magazine International wrote, "The intriguing element about "The Very Edge", under Cyril Frankel's assured direction, was that Tracey Lawrence had more of a psychic bond with her attacker than she did with her own husband. ... She had a compassion for his illness and she was, ironically, less of a victim around Mullen than she was around Geoffrey. ... Brett was riveting as the tortured psycho..."; and Sky Movies wrote, "Producer Raymond Stross put his wife Anne Heywood through her most strenuous acting test to date when he and Leslie Bricusse thought up this dramatic thriller...The plot bears a strong resemblance to the previous year's Return of a Stranger with John Ireland, although that didn't have the benefit of the distinguished supporting cast here, which includes Nicole Maurey, Jeremy Brett, Barbara Mullen, Maurice Denham, William Lucas, Gwen Watford and Patrick Magee."

References

External links

1963 films
1963 drama films
British drama films
Films directed by Cyril Frankel
1960s English-language films
1960s British films